Claibornicardia is an extinct genus of marine bivalve molluscs in the family Carditidae. It is sometimes considered a subgenus of either Glyptoactis or Venericardia. It has been found in the Americas and Europe.

Species 
No species are yet listed by the World Register of Marine Species, but they may include:

 †Claibornicardia aalterensis Vervoenen and van Nieulande, 2010
 †Claibornicardia alticostata Conrad, 1833 (also Venericardia (Claibornicardia) alticostata and, less commonly, Glyptoactis alticostata)
 †Claibornicardia carinata Sowerby 1819
 †Claibornicardia domenginica Vokes 1939 (also Glyptoactis (Claibornicardia) domenginica)
 †Claibornicardia nasuta Dall 1903 (also Venericardia (Claibornicardia) nasuta)
 †Claibornicardia paleopatagonica Ihering, 1903
 †Claibornicardia trapaquara Harris 1895 (also Venericardia (Claibornicardia) trapaquara)

References 

Carditidae
Prehistoric bivalve genera